Ceretophyes is a genus of beetles belonging to the family Leiodidae.

The species of this genus are found in Iberian Peninsula.

Species:

Ceretophyes cenarroi 
Ceretophyes riberai

References

Leiodidae